The 11095/11096 Ahimsa Express is an Express train belonging to Indian Railways that runs between  and  in India. It is currently being operated with 11095/11096 train numbers on a weekly basis.

It operates as train number 11095 from Ahmedabad Junction to Pune Junction and as train number 11096 in the reverse direction, serving the states of Gujarat and Maharashtra. The word Ahimsa means non-violent in Devangiri.

Coach composition

The train consists of 22 coaches:

 1 AC 1st Class
 1 AC 2 tier
 6 AC 3 tier
 10 Sleeper class
 2 Unreserved/General
 2 Seating cum Luggage Rake

Service

 11095/Ahmedabad–Pune Ahimsa Express covers the distance of 625 kilometres in 12 hours 25 minutes (50 km/hr).
 11096/Pune–Ahmedabad Ahimsa Express covers the distance of 625 kilometres in 11 hours 55 minutes (52 km/hr).

As the average speed of the train is below , its fare does not include a Superfast surcharge.

Route and halts 

,  to Ahmedabad Junction.

Schedule

Rake sharing

The train shares its rake with; 
 11087/11088 Veraval–Pune Express, 
 11089/11090 Bhagat Ki Kothi–Pune Express, 
 11091/11092 Bhuj–Pune Express,
 12103/12104 Pune–Lucknow Superfast Express.

Traction

The entire route is fully electrified.

Previously, the train was powered by a Kalyan-based WCAM-3 end to end.

With the switchover from DC traction to AC traction, it is now hauled by a Vadodara-based WAP-4E / WAP-5 locomotive.

References

External links
 
 
 

Named passenger trains of India
Rail transport in Maharashtra
Rail transport in Gujarat
Transport in Ahmedabad
Transport in Pune
Express trains in India
Railway services introduced in 1991